Maruggio is a village and comune in the province of Taranto, Apulia, southeast Italy. The village is located in a natural depression  from the Gulf of Taranto, in the north-west part of Salento peninsula and it's one of the villages of South Italy where the Greek dialect Griko is spoken.

Territory 

There are no rivers, except a little creek, the Canale del Curso, near Castigno, in the western part of Maruggio's territory.
 

History
Maruggio was founded by Gorgolano, the Byzantine governor, with the union from the ancient hamlets of Castigno, Olivaro, Albano, Roselle and San Nicolò. After a period under the Knights Templar, from 1317 to 1819 it was ruled by the Knights of Malta. In 1819 it became an autonomous commune.

Economy
Tourism is the main wealth source. Tourism is developed especially along the coast, in the village of Campomarino, that is very famous for its clean sea, for the wonderful beach and in particular for the harbour, that is only along the coast between Taranto and Porto Cesareo. But the economy is tied up to the agriculture too. In fact Maruggio is famous for the oil and wine Primitivo.

Main sights
 *Mother Church (15th century, rebuilt after the 1743 earthquake)
Church of San Giovanni Battista fuori le Mura (late 15th century)
Church of Sant'Eligio (late 16th century)
Church of Annunziata 
Church and convent of Santa Maria delle Grazie (16th century). It has a cloister with Baroque frescoes depicting histories of Saints.
Palazzo dei Commendatori, former castle of Knights of Malta
Church of Santa Maria del Tempio 
 Caniglia's Palace 
 Covelli-De Marco's Palace
 Longo's Palace (16th century)
 Armieri's Palace (17th century)
 Massafra's Palace (19th century)
 Morleo's Palace (19th century).

References

Cities and towns in Apulia
Localities of Salento